Tressignaux is a commune in the Côtes-d'Armor department in the Brittany region in northwestern France.

The Chapel of Saint-Antoine, located in the village, was built in the thirteenth century and rebuilt in the sixteenth.  Each year, a "pardon" is celebrated on the 3rd Sunday in August, attracting visitors to the village.

Population

Inhabitants of Tressignaux are called tressignaulais in French.

See also
Communes of the Côtes-d'Armor department

References

External links

History and information about Tressignaux 

Photo of Chapel of Saint-Antoine
Etymology and History of Tressignaux 

Communes of Côtes-d'Armor